Martinus Nellius (1621 – 1719) was a Dutch Golden Age still life painter.

Biography	
According to the RKD it is unknown where he was born, but he is first registered in Leiden in 1674 and from 1676 in The Hague, where he later died. Dated works are known during the period 1671 to 1712.

References	
	
	
Martinus Nellius on Artnet	
	
	
	
	
	
1621 births	
1719 deaths	
Dutch Golden Age painters
Dutch male painters	
Artists from The Hague
Dutch still life painters